John Skully (fl. 1388–1407), of Shoreham-by-Sea, Sussex, was an English politician.

He was a Member (MP) of the Parliament of England for New Shoreham in October 1382, September 1388, 1391, 1393 and 1407.

References

Year of birth missing
Year of death missing
English MPs October 1382
English MPs September 1388
People from Shoreham-by-Sea
English MPs 1391
English MPs 1393
English MPs 1407